John Percy may refer to:
John Percy (Jesuit) (1569–1641), English Jesuit priest and controversialist
John Percy (metallurgist) (1817–1889), English physician and metallurgist
John de Percy, MP for Coventry

See also